The Maiden is a painting by the Austrian painter Gustav Klimt painted in year 1913. The Maiden was one of Klimt's last paintings before he died.Currently it is stored in the National Gallery in Prague, Czech Republic.

Description 
The abundance of the flowers in the painting symbolizes the evolution into womanhood. The painting depicts seven women that are interlacing. Each woman represents a particular life stage. The painting touches on various topics of human life, such as love, sexuality and regeneration that are depicted in cyclical shape. The virgin's gown with its many spirals of blue and purple metaphorically indicates fertility, continual change and the evolution of the universe.

External links 
 WikiArt.org

References

1913 paintings
Paintings by Gustav Klimt
Paintings in the collection of the National Gallery Prague
Oil on canvas paintings
Women in art